Colby Wooden (born December 21, 2000) is an American football defensive end who currently plays for the Auburn Tigers.

Early life and high school
Wooden grew up in Lawrenceville, Georgia and attended Archer High School. As a senior, he was named the GHSA Region 8-AAAAA Defensive Player of the Year by the The Atlanta Journal-Constitution. Wooden was rated a three-star recruit and committed to play college football at Auburn University over an offer from Clemson.

College career
Wooden missed much of his freshman season after contracting mononucleosis. Overall, he played in three games and made four tackles. Wooden finished his redshirt freshman season with 42 tackles, 9.5 for loss, and four sacks. As a redshirt sophomore, he made 61 tackles with 8.5 tackles for a loss and five sacks. Wooden considered entering the 2022 NFL Draft, but opted to return to Auburn for his redshirt junior season.

References

External links
 Auburn Tigers bio

Living people
American football defensive ends
Players of American football from Georgia (U.S. state)
Auburn Tigers football players
2000 births